Partial list of Iraqi poets. 

 Abdul Hadi al-Shirazi
 Muhammad Sa'id al-Habboubi
 Rabab Al-Kadhimi
 Alise Alousi
 Ali Bader
 Ahmed Matar
 Amira Nur al-Din
 Atika Wahbi al-Khazraji
 Bahira Abdulatif
 Daisy Al-Amir
 Fatina al-Na'ib
 Lamia Abbas Amara
 Fuzuli (writer)
 Hidir Lutfi
 Hijri Dede
 Muhammad Sadiq Hassan
 Muhammad Sa'id al-Sakkar
 Mulla Effendi
 Najiba Ahmad
 Nalî
 Nasrallah al-Haeri
 Nazik Al-Malaika
 Qusay al-Shaykh Askar
 Riza Talabani
 Wafaa Abed Al Razzaq
 Zaki al-Sarraf
 Zuhur Dixon

External links
 almoajam.org/Iraqi (in Arabic)

Iraq
poets